Back Alley Film Productions is a television production company founded by Janis Lundman and Adrienne Mitchell and based in Toronto, Ontario, and Montreal, Quebec Canada. Founded in 1989, Back Alley is a creator and producer of original content for television with programming available in more than 120 countries worldwide.

Back Alley is currently producing Coroner starring Serinda Swan for CBC. Coroner premiered in January 2019 as the highest-rated new drama series on CBC in more than four years, delivering an average audience of more than one million viewers. It also premiered as the highest-ever rated launch in the UK for Universal TV. Coroner was picked up for season two in March 2019.

Back Alley also recently produced Bellevue starring Anna Paquin for CBC and WGN America. Other productions include Played, a 1-hour police drama series for CTV and Bomb Girls, a series that followed the lives of women working in a munitions factory during WWII for Global Television. Starring Meg Tilly the series won the Outstanding Drama award at the 2013 Gracie Awards and was nominated for the prestigious Rockie Award at the Banff Television Festival. Back Alley also produced the Movie of the Week, Bomb Girls: Facing the Enemy, which won the 2015 Canadian Screen Award for Best TV Movie or Mini-Series. Back Alley's other credits include three seasons of the award-winning Durham County, which has sold to over 100 countries internationally; the women's erotica series, Bliss; the hip hop series Drop the Beat and Straight Up with Sarah Polley.

Productions

Television series
Coroner
Bellevue
 Played
 Bomb Girls & Bomb Girls: Facing the Enemy (MOW)
 Durham County
 Bliss
 Drop the Beat
 Straight Up

Non-fiction
 Lawn and Order
 Talk 19
 Talk 16

Awards and nominations 
Mitchell and Lundman won the Production Award for Excellence from Women in Film & Television - Toronto.

In 2017, Mitchell was honoured by the Toronto ACTRA Women's Committee. She received the Nell Shipman Award for her efforts in advancing gender equity in the entertainment industry.

Bomb Girls - Facing the Enemy
 Canadian Screen Awards
 Best Dramatic Miniseries or TV Movie - Janis Lundman, Adrienne Mitchell, Michael Prupas
 Best Performance by an Actress in a Leading Role in a Dramatic Program or Mini-Series - Jodi Balfour
 Best Best Performance by an Actress in a Featured Supporting Role in a Dramatic Program or Series - Ali Liebert
 Canadian Screen Award Nominations
 Best Achievement in Makeup - Eva Coudouloux, Katerina Chovanec
 Best Photography in a Dramatic Series - Eric Cayla
 Leo Awards
 Best Supporting Performance by a Male, Television Movie - Antonio Cupo
 Directors Guild of Canada Award Nominations  
 Best Television Movie/Miniseries
 Best Production Design, Television Movie/Miniseries - Aidan Leroux 
 Best Picture Editing, Television Movie/Miniseries - Tad Seaborn
 Best Sound Editing, Television Movie/Miniseries - Peter Lopata, Jill Purdy

Played
 Canadian Screen Awards
 Best Cross Platform Project, Fiction - Played: Interference
 Leo Award Nominations
 Best Supporting Performance by a Female, Dramatic Series - Agam Darshi
 Best Guest Performance by a Male, Dramatic Series - Serge Houde
 Best Guest Performance by a Female, Dramatic Series - Camille Sullivan
 Best Guest Performance by a Female, Dramatic Series - Kacey Rohl

Bomb Girls - Season 2
 Canadian Screen Awards
 Best Costume Design - Debra Hanson
 Best Achievement in Casting - Lisa Parasyn, Jon Comerford
 Canadian Screen Award Nominations
 Best Dramatic Series
 Best Performance by an Actress in a Continuing Leading Dramatic Role - Meg Tilly
 Best Achievement in Casting - Eva Coudouloux, Katerina Chovanec
 Best Photography in a Dramatic Program or Series - Eric Cayla
 Directors Guild of Canada Award Nominations 
 Best Production Design Television Series - Aidan Leroux
 Leo Award Nominations
 Best Supporting Performance by a Male, Dramatic Series - Brett Dier

Bomb Girls - Season 1
 Canadian Screen Awards 
 Best Performance by an Actress in a Continuing Leading Dramatic Role - Meg Tilly
 Best Costume Design - Joanne Hansen
 Best Production Design or Art Direction in a Fiction Program or Series - Aidan Leroux
 Canadian Screen Award Nominations
 Best Dramatic Series
 Best Cross Platform Project, Fiction - Bomb Girls Interactive
 Rockie Award Nomination
 Continuing Series Programs, Scripted
 Directors Guild of Canada Award Nominations 
 Best Production Design Television Series - Aidan Leroux

Durham County – Season 3
 Gemini Awards
 Best Achievement in Casting - Marissa Richmond, Libby Goldstein, Andrea Kenyon, Suzanne Smith, Randi Wells
 Gemini Award Nominations
 Best Direction in a Dramatic Series - Charles Biname
 Best Sound in a Dramatic Series - Steve Moore, Alex Bullick, Yann Cleary, Christian Cooke, Andrea Higgins, Jill Purdy, Marilee Yorston
 Best Performance by an Actor in a Continuing Lead Dramatic Role - Hugh Dillon
 Best Performance by an Actor in a Guest Role, Dramatic Series - Michael Nardone
 Best Performance by an Actress in Featured Supporting Role in a Dramatic Series - Benedicte Decary
2011 WorldFest-Houston Remi Awards
 Winner of a Gold 2011 Worldfest Remi Award in the category of TV Series - Dramatic.
2011 Monte-Carlo TV Festival Awards
 Nominated for 5 awards including: Outstanding International Producers (Janis Lundman, Adrienne Mitchell, Michael Prupas), Outstanding Actor (Hugh Dillon, Michael Nardone) and Outstanding Actress (Hélène Joy, Laurence Leboeuf).
2011 WorldFest-Houston Remi Awards
 Nominated for a 2011 Worldfest Remi Award in the category of TV Series - Dramatic.
Interactive Media 2010 Award
 Best in Class - Television in recognition of Durham County - Season 3 Website www.durhamcounty.ca
 WGC Screenwriting Award
 Script for "Distance, Hunting and Home", written by Laurie Finstad Knizhnik, was chosen as a finalist

Durham County – Season 2

 Gemini Awards
Best Achievement in Main Title Design - Kevin Chandoo
Best Achievement in Make-Up - Eva Coudouloux and Adrien Morot
 Gemini Nominations
Best Dramatic Series
Best Direction in a Dramatic Series - Adrienne Mitchell
Best Performance by an Actress in a Continuing Leading Dramatic Role - Helene Joy
Best Achievement in Casting - Andrea Kenyon, Wendy O'Brien, Marissa Richmond, and Randi Wells
 Monte-Carlo Television Festival
Winner of 2010 Golden Nymph Award
Outstanding Actress- Michelle Forbes (Drama TV Series)
 Monte-Carlo Television Festival Nominations
Outstanding Actor – Hugh Dillon (Drama TV Series)
Outstanding International Producer – Janis Lundman, Adrienne Mitchell, Laurie Finstad Knizhnik and Michael Prupas (Drama TV Series)
 Directors Guild of Canada Award Winners
Best Direction- TV Series - Adrienne Mitchell
Best Production Design- TV Series - Donna Noonan
 Directors Guild of Canada Award Nominee
Best Picture Editing- TV Series
 EMPixx Awards
Platinum Award for Best National Cable Program in the Entertainment Category
 WorldFest – Houston International Film Festival
Winner of the Platinum Award - Best TV Series – Drama

Durham County – Season 1
 Winner of 5 Canadian Gemini Awards for Best Writing in a Dramatic Series, Best Direction in a Dramatic Series, Best Performance by an Actress in a Continuing Leading Dramatic Role, Best Performance by an Actor in a Continuing Leading Dramatic Role and Best Sound in a Dramatic Series
 Winner of 2 Directors Guild of Canada Awards for Best Editing – Dramatic Series and Direction – Television Series
 Winner of CFTPA Indie Award for Best Dramatic Series
 Nominated for 7 Canadian Gemini Awards for Best Dramatic Series, Best Performance by an Actor in a Continuing Leading Dramatic Role, Best Performance by an Actress in a Featured Supporting Role in a Dramatic Series, Best Photography in a Dramatic Program or Series, Best Picture Editing in a Dramatic Program or Series, Best Costume Design and Best Achievement in Casting.
 Nominated for 2 Directors Guild of Canada Awards for Team Television Series – Drama and Production Design – Television Series
 Nominated for the Writers Guild of Canada Award for Best Writing in a Dramatic Series
 Nominated for 2 ACTRA Montreal Awards for Outstanding Female Performance and Outstanding Male Performance
 Nominated for 2 Leo Awards for Best Supporting Performance by a Female in a Dramatic Series and Best Supporting Performance by a Male in a Dramatic Series.

Bliss
 Canadian Gemini Award for Best Sound in a Dramatic Series.
 Canadian Gemini Nominations for Best Dramatic Series, Best Production Design, Best Picture Editing, Best Direction in a Dramatic Series.

Drop the Beat
 Canadian Gemini Award Nomination for Best Dramatic Series

Straight Up
 Writers Guild of Canada Award
 Canadian Gemini Award for Best Direction
 Canadian Gemini Award for Best Youth Actor
 Canadian Gemini Award Nomination for Best Dramatic Series

Lawn and Order
 Chicago Film Festival - Silver Plaque for Humour

Talk 16
 San Francisco Film Festival Special Jury Prize
 Florida Film Festival Best Documentary Grand Jury Prize

References

External links
 Website: http://www.backalleyfilms.ca/

Television production companies of Canada
Film production companies of Canada